Gisela Babel (born 23 May 1938) was a German politician of the Free Democratic Party (FDP) and former member of the German Bundestag.

Life 
From 1987 until her resignation on 17 December 1990, Gisela Babel was a member of the Hessian State Parliament and was the social policy spokesperson for the FDP State Parliamentary Group.

From 1990 to 1998 she was a member of the German Bundestag.

Literature

References

1938 births
Members of the Bundestag for Hesse
Members of the Bundestag 1994–1998
Members of the Bundestag 1990–1994
Female members of the Bundestag
20th-century German women politicians
Members of the Bundestag for the Free Democratic Party (Germany)
Members of the Landtag of Hesse
Living people